The Scottish cricket team toured Ireland from 18 to 21 June 2015 to play four Twenty20 International (T20I) matches. Scotland won the four-match series 2–0, with two games declared no-results due to rain. Originally planned as a three-match series, an extra game was added to the schedule after the second match was abandoned without a ball being bowled due to rain. The tour was a warm-up for the 2015 ICC World Twenty20 Qualifier which took place in Ireland the following month.

Squads

On 16 June Ireland's Paul Stirling and John Mooney were removed from the squad. Stirling was required for matches with Middlesex and Mooney pulled out due to family commitments. They were replaced by David Rankin and John Anderson.

T20I series

1st T20I

2nd T20I

3rd T20I

4th T20I

References

External links
 Series home at ESPN Cricinfo

2015 in Scottish cricket
2015 in Irish cricket
International cricket competitions in 2015
International cricket tours of Ireland